The Assam Legislative Assembly Election of 2016 was held in two phases, on 4 and 11 April 2016, to elect members of the 126 constituencies in Assam, a state in North-eastern India. The overall voter turnout was 84.72%, which set a new record for Assam. The turnout was an increase from the 2011 Assembly election figure of 75%.

The counting of votes and results declaration was completed on 19 May 2016. The election brought a change of power as the Indian National Congress (INC), which had formed the government under Tarun Gogoi since 2001, lost its majority to the Bharatiya Janata Party (BJP, lit "Indian People's Party") led by Sarbananda Sonowal.

Background 
The prior Assam assembly ended on 5 June 2016. The full bench of the Election Commission headed by Syed Nasim Ahmad Zaidi visited Assam on 21 December 2015. Voter-verified paper audit trails were introduced in 10 constituencies (approximately 2400 polling booths) in Assam assembly polls. These included the four assembly constituencies in Kamrup Metro district: Dispur, Jalukbari, Gauhati East and Gauhati West. 250 polling stations were made model polling stations.

Electoral process
An update to the National Register of Citizens of India (NRC) was to be completed by 1 January 2016, monitored by the Supreme Court of India. By September 2015, the first phase was completed; over 66.90 lakh (6,690,000) households submitted forms linking themselves to either the NRC of 1951 or any of the electoral rolls prior to 24 March 1971. It was to be followed by verifying the applications.

The effort was intended to detect and deport the illegal migrants who came from neighbouring Bangladesh on or after 25 March 1971. Since 1985, Foreigners' Tribunals have declared over 38,000 persons in Assam as illegal migrants. Nearly 1.5 lakh (150,000) names in Assam's electoral rolls carry the prefix "D" for "Doubtful" citizenship status. The Supreme Court directed the Assam Government to complete the final NRC by 1 March 2016. In May 2015, the historic India–Bangladesh land swap deal was signed, exchanging long-standing territorial enclaves and simplifying the border.

According to the draft electoral rolls published in October 2015, the total number of voters in Assam stands at 1.92 crores (19.2  million). The Election Commission said that final electoral rolls would be published by 11 January 2016.

Religion data
According to the 2011 census, 61.5% were Hindus, 34.22% were Muslims. Christian minorities (3.7%) are mostly among some of the Scheduled Castes and Tribes (SC/ST) population. The Scheduled Tribe population (both ST(Plains) and ST(Hills) combined) in Assam is around 13% of which the Bodo people(an indigenous Assamese community) account for 40% and the Scheduled Caste population is about 7.4% of which the Kaibarta and Jal Keot(both indigenous Assamese communities) combined account for about 36%.

Out of 32 districts of Assam, 11 are Muslim majority according to the 2011 census. The districts are Dhubri, Goalpara, Barpeta, Morigaon, Nagaon, Hojai, Karimganj, South Salmara–Mankachar, Hailakandi, Darrang and Bongaigaon. Bodos have a population share of 12% and the Kaibarta and Jal Keot have a total share of about 10% (all of which are a part of the indigenous Assamese community). The share of the indigenous Assamese communities in Assam was about 47% in the 2001 census which has reduced to about 40-45% in 2016 as predicted by experts. Indigenous Assamese Muslims, also known as Khilonjia Muslims, include ethnic groups such as Goria and Moria, and are estimated to be around 40 lakhs in population out of a total 1 crore (4 million out of 10 million) Muslims in Assam.

Campaign
In November 2015, Bharatiya Janata Party (BJP) President Amit Shah held a party workers' rally in Dibrugarh in Upper Assam Division. Union Minister and Lakhimpur MP Sarbananda Sonowal was made Assam BJP chief to head their election committee. Sonowal found the situation of illegal immigration from Bangladesh "very alarming". (Sonowal had led an effort to have the controversial Illegal Migrants (Determination by Tribunal) (IMDT) Act struck down by the Supreme court of India in December 2006, making deportations easier.) Himanta Biswa Sarma, a state Congress heavyweight joined BJP. BJP has aimed for 'Mission 84' in Assam. BJP led in 69 assembly constituencies in the Lok Sabha elections 2014 by winning 7 Lok Sabha seats in Assam. For the first time, the BJP had contested the Bodoland Territorial Council elections, and won a seat.

In December 2015, Indian National Congress (INC) Vice-President Rahul Gandhi visited Assam where he accused Rashtriya Swayamsevak Sangh (RSS, lit "National Volunteer Organisation") workers of not letting him enter Barpeta Satra temple in Barpeta district. RSS, widely regarded as the parent organisation of BJP, denied the charge. Gandhi announced that Tarun Gogoi would be the chief minister candidate of INC. Demand was growing for giving scheduled tribe (ST) status to six communities – Tai Ahoms, Koch Rajbongshis, Moran, Motok, Sootea and 36 tea tribes (the descendants of tea garden workers settled by British in the state from Chotanagpur plateau in the mid-19th century).

In November 2015, nine members of the legislative assembly left the INC and joined BJP. Assam Governor PB Acharya made a controversial statement that Hindustan is only for Hindus. Ex-United Liberation Front of Assam (ULFA) rebels announced that they would contest Assam polls. On 26 December 2015, BJP's Assam unit launched its 'Assam Nirman' initiative, seeking public opinion to prepare a vision document for development in Assam.

On 28 December 2015, Smriti Irani visited Barak Valley in Assam and accused the Tarun Gogoi government of not doing enough for women's safety. Gogoi accused the National Democratic Alliance (NDA) government of stalling tactics on granting citizenship to refugees from Bangladesh, claiming that they had been persecuted there. Gogoi said external affairs minister Sushma Swaraj met with businessmen in Assam during her visit instead of talking about the problems and issues confronting the state.

In January 2016, the Gogoi government announced rice prices at Rs 2 per kilogramme and to build all-religion . The Assam INC President ruled-out any alliance with All India United Democratic Front (AIUDF) or Asom Gana Parishad (AGP, lit "Assam Peoples Association") parties. Union Home Minister Rajnath Singh visited Assam on 3 January 2016 and said the fencing along the Indo-Bangladesh border would be completed by December 2016. A delegation of the All Assam Students Union (AASU) met Singh and visited the border areas. Rajnath Singh visited Dhubri district and expressed dissatisfaction with the fencing work there. He said that a feasibility study and two pilot projects were underway in the Dhubri sector of the riverine border. Gogoi said that 97.32% of the border fencing work in Karimganj and Dhubri was complete and asked the Central Government to take up a pilot project involving technological solutions to plug the riverine border.

Prime Minister Narendra Modi addressed a rally in Kokrajhar on 19 January 2016, after his visit to Sikkim on 18 January 2016. Modi formally announced the alliance of Bodoland People's Front (BPF) with BJP in Assam.

On 28 January, the BJP Parliamentary Board announced Sarbananda Sonowal as their Chief Ministerial candidate of Assam. Union minister of state for commerce and industry Nirmala Sitharaman accused Gogoi of spreading misinformation on the suspension of the North East Industrial and Investment Promotion Policy (NEIIPP), 2007. Ethnic groups of Assam sought ULFA pro-talks faction headed by founding general secretary Anup Chetia to help them receive ST designation.

Modi arrived on 5 February to first attend the 85th conference of the Srimanta Sankaradeva Sangha at the erstwhile Ahom capital of Sivasagar. Then he addressed a rally at Moran. Modi dedicated the Assam gas cracker project at Dibrugarh and inaugurated the 2016 South Asian Games in Guwahati on 5 February.

On 2 March, the BJP announced its alliance with AGP. AGP was given 24 seats. Gogoi announced a special package of Rs 3,000 cr (Rs 30 billion) for Barak Valley. Gandhi visited Assam for two days, 4–5 March 2016, and addressed public meetings in Silchar and Nagaon. On 6 March 2016, INC allied with Bodo-heartland-based United People's Party in a strategy to counter BJP's alliance with BPF.

On 10 March, BJP declared candidates for the first phase of Assam elections. Out of 126 Assembly constituencies, BJP contested 84 constituencies and left 42 to its four National Democratic Alliance (NDA) allies: AGP (24), BPF (16), Rabha Jatiya Aikya Manch (1) and Tiwa Jatiya Aikya Manch (1). BJP gave tickets to two ex-militants including Bhaskar Sarma (who was accused of secret killings). On 16 March 2016, Sarbananda Sonowal filed his nomination for the Majuli (ST) assembly seat. Modi addressed a rally in Majuli on 23 March 2016. INC released its first list of 65 candidates on 15 March 2016; the second list of 57 candidates was announced on 21 March 2016. INC contested 122 seats while its ally United People's Party contested the remaining 4 seats. BJP's Himanta Biswa Sarma filed nomination papers from Jalukbari on 21 March 2016. AIUDF contested around 76 seats while its allies in Assam – Rashtriya Janata Dal (RJD) and Janata Dal (United) (JD[U]) – contest 12 seats each. AIUDF chief Badruddin Ajmal ran for South Salmara seat, while Gogoi ran for the Titabar seat against BJP MP Kamakhya Prasad Tasa.

On 12 February 2016, the Election Commission of India announced that 10 assembly constituencies in Assam will have 2300 voter-verified paper audit trail (VVPAT) machines attached along with electronic voting machines (EVMs).

Schedule 
The dates of the election were announced on 4 March 2016. (In previous elections, all 140 constituencies went to polls on the same day.)

The polling was held in two phases, on 4 and 11 April 2016. The counting was scheduled for 19 May 2016 for both phases.

Opinion polls

Exit polls

Voting
Voter turnout was 84.72%. 87.03% polling was recorded in the second phase, the highest in Assam's history. One person was killed by police in Assam. 189 EVMs were replaced in the final phase due to technical issues. A total of 1,064 candidates contested the elections – 122 from INC, 89 from BJP, 74 from AIUDF, 30 from AGP, 13 from the BPF, 15 from CPI, 19 from CPM, 205 others and 497 Independents. The total number of polling stations in Assam was 24,890, spread across 50 election districts.

Result

! colspan="3" rowspan="2" width="150" |Parties and Coalitions
! colspan="3" | Popular vote
! colspan="3" |Seats
|-
! width="70" | Vote
! width="45" | %
! width ="50"| +/-
! Contested
! width="45" | Won
!+/-
|-
|bgcolor="|
|Bharatiya Janata Party
|Rowspan=5|NDA
|4,992,185
|29.5
|
|84
|60
|55
|-
| bgcolor=|
|Asom Gana Parishad
|1,377,482
|8.1
|
|24
|14
|5
|-
|bgcolor="|
|Bodoland People's Front
|666,057
|3.9
|
|16
|12
|
|-
|
|Rabha Jatiya Aikya Manch
|
|
|
|1
|0
|
|-
|
|Tiwa Jatiya Aikya Manch
|
|
|
|1
|0
|
|-
|bgcolor=|
|Indian National Congress
|Rowspan=2|UPA
|5,238,655
|30.9
|
|122
|26
|53
|-
|bgcolor=#F3ED13|
|United People's Party Liberal
|
|
|
|4
|0
|
|-
| bgcolor=|
| All India United Democratic Front
|Rowspan=2|G.A
|2,207,945
|13.0
|
|74
|13
|5
|-
| bgcolor=|
| Janata Dal (United)
|12,538
|0.07
|
|4
|0
|
|-
| bgcolor=|
| Communist Party of India (Marxist)
|Rowspan=2|Left
|93,508
|0.55
|
|19
|0
|
|-
| bgcolor=|
| Communist Party of India
|37,243
|0.22
|
|15
|0
|
|-
| bgcolor=|
| Independents
|
|1,867,531
|11.04
|
|496
|1
|2
|-
|
! colspan=2 |Total
|16919364
|100.0
|
|126
|
|
|-
! colspan="10" |
|-
| style="text-align:left;" colspan="2" |Valid votes
| align="right" |
| align="right" |
| colspan="5" rowspan="5" style="background-color:#E9E9E9"  |
|-
| style="text-align:left;" colspan="2" |Invalid votes
| align="right" |
| align="right" |
|-
| style="text-align:left;" colspan="2" |Votes cast / turnout
| align="right" | 
| align="right" | 
|-
| style="text-align:left;" colspan="2" |Abstentions
| align="right" | 
| align="right" |
|-
| style="text-align:left;" colspan="2" |Registered voters
| align="right" | 
|colspan="1" style="background-color:#E9E9E9"|
|-
|}

Results by Constituency

Share

Seat Share

See also 
 2016 elections in India
 2011 Assam Legislative Assembly election
 Bangladeshis in India
 Illegal Migrants (Determination by Tribunal) Act, 1983
 National Register of Citizens of India

References

External links
Election Commission of India

Assam
2016
2016